The Mid-Atlantic gap is a geographical term applied to an undefended area beyond the reach of land-based RAF Coastal Command antisubmarine (A/S) aircraft during the Battle of the Atlantic in the Second World War. It is frequently known as The Black Pit, as well as the Atlantic Gap, Air Gap, Greenland Gap, or just "the Gap". This resulted in heavy merchant shipping losses to U-boats. The gap was eventually closed in May 1943, as growing numbers of VLR Liberators (Very Long Range models) and escort carriers became available, and as basing problems were addressed.

History
RAF Coastal Command, when it was created in 1936, was given responsibility for A/S (or ASW, anti submarine warfare) patrol. It was equipped only with small numbers of short-ranged aircraft, the most common being the Avro Anson (which was obsolescent by the start of World War II) and Vickers Vildebeest (which was obsolete); for a time, shortages of aircraft were so severe, "scarecrow patrols" using Tiger Moths were even employed. Bomber Command routinely got higher priority for the best, longest-ranged aircraft. Only as Bomber Command transitioned to four-engined aircraft did Coastal Command receive the castoffs, such as Vickers Wellingtons, which finally had adequate range for A/S patrol. Moreover, Coastal Command's motley assortment of Ansons, Whitleys, and Hampdens were unable to carry the standard 450 lb (205 kg) depth charge; that needed Wellingtons or Sunderlands. (The other aircraft capable of carrying it, the Avro Lancaster, was Bomber Command's crown jewel.)

Coastal Command's prize was the Consolidated Aircraft Liberator GR.I, commonly called the VLR Liberator or just VLR. The Liberator B.I proved too vulnerable for bombing missions over Europe, but had excellent range and payload, ideal for A/S patrol. Top priority for these was the U.S. Navy for reconnaissance operations in the Pacific, where their long legs were equally valuable, but where they generally carried out missions of lower priority than Coastal Command's.

VLRs were of particular importance in times when Bletchley Park was unable to read Kriegsmarine Enigma (Ultra). Fifteen U-boats converged on ON 131, only to meet aircraft, and Coastal Command sank two, while in protecting ON 136, 120 Squadron's VLRs sank  on 12 October 1942. Even then, VLRs proved invaluable in co-operation with shipborne "Huff Duff". Defending SC 104, VLRs guided by HF/DF drove off three shadowers in one day, 16 October. They bettered the performance on 29 October, for HX 212, driving off five, and seven on 6 November around SC 107. "...[T]he apparent inadequacy Newfoundland-based air support was highlighted by the early interception of SC 107 and the resultant bitter and costly battle." This led RAF to belatedly move a number of Coastal Command squadrons.

The paltry nine Liberator GR.Is operating over the Atlantic, members of 120 Squadron based in Iceland, were nevertheless a worry to Admiral Dönitz, BdU. As a measure of how valuable they were, after patrols off Canada were added in 1942, only one ship was lost in convoy. Even in mid-1942, Coastal Command only had two squadrons of Liberators and Fortresses, and at the first sign of Coastal Command's success against U-boats, Harris sought to have their aircraft used in attacking German cities.

After Convoy SC 118, Professor Patrick M. S. Blackett, Director of the Admiralty's Operations Research section, made several proposals, including diverting VLRs from Bomber Command to Coastal Command. "Despite the strength of Blackett's case, the Admiralty (not to mention the Air Ministry, Bomber Command, and the Americans) believed for some time yet that it could not afford to reduce the heavy air offensive in the Bay of Biscay or to abandon the bombing of German bases by the RAF." "The number of VLR aircraft operating in the North Atlantic in February [1943] was only 18, and no substantial increase was made until after the crisis of March." Nor were night air patrols, recognized as necessary, initiated until the autumn of 1943.

Bomber Command did not refuse entirely to offer assistance against U-boats. From 14 January 1943 through May, they flew seven thousand sorties against the U-boat pens in Lorient, Brest, and St. Nazaire, at a cost of 266 aircraft and crews. They accomplished no damage to the pens nor the submarines within them. Coastal Command strength never reached 266 VLRs. Missions flown against German U-boat building yards had similarly disappointing results.

Aircraft also had an important indirect role, by preventing even the formation of wolf packs. They limited the places U-boats could attack in safety, and (by reducing the ability of shadowers to find and track convoys) made shipping harder to find, thereby reducing losses. This also helped escorts, by enabling them to deal with one U-boat at a time. Despite a willingness of RCAF aircraft to fly in (perennially bad) conditions off the Grand Banks Coastal Command would never have attempted, U-boats could trail convoys beginning very soon after departure from Halifax. Without air-to-surface vessel radar (ASV), the almost "perpetual fog of the Grand Banks also allowed pack operations to penetrate within a couple of hundred miles of Newfoundland, while aircraft patrolled harmlessly above", visual detection impossible.

A means of detecting surfaced submarines at night, when they were at their most vulnerable, recharging batteries, and felt most safe, was a top priority for Coastal Command. ASV gave it to them. The previous AI.II (Mark 2 Airborne Interception) radar became ASV.II (Air to Surface Vessel Mark 2) fitted in Coastal Command aircraft. Coastal Command priority for it, however, ranked behind Fighter Command's night fighter units. ASV.II's 1½-metre wavelength (actually 1.7 m, 176 MHz), mid-VHF band emissions meant however, that a submarine was usually lost in sea return before it came in visual range, at around a mile (1,850 m), by which time it was already diving. In response, the Leigh light was developed. Though it had to overcome Air Ministry indifference, and only entered service in June 1941, it proved very successful. This, however, required a large aircraft, such as the Wellington or Liberator, to carry the generator needed to power the light, and most of Coastal Command's aircraft were incapable of it, nor were Bomber Command inclined to turn over anything better. Moreover, the Germans developed Metox, which picked up ASV's radar pulses before it was able to detect a submarine at all, rendering it useless.

The appearance of H2S three gigahertz-frequency (10 cm) radar changed that, and the combination of H2S (as ASV.III) and Leigh light proved lethal to U-boats. Harris, however, denied Coastal Command any allocation of H2S systems, claiming Bomber Command needed it to find targets, in preference to Gee and Oboe, while arguing Coastal Command might lose it to the Germans. Churchill backed him up. Marshal John Slessor, head of Coastal Command, countered Bomber Command also risked having it fall in enemy hands, and having the Germans produce a countermeasure against it, before Coastal Command ever got to use it. In the event, this was exactly what happened. The first ASV.III was fitted to a Coastal Command Wellington at Defford in December 1942, with twelve based at Chivenor by February 1943, while a copy of H2S was lost 2/3 February when a Stirling Pathfinder was shot down over the Netherlands, on only H2S's second operational use. Harris made similar objections to supplying the American-created 3 cm-wavelength H2X radar units to Coastal Command (which knew it as ASV.IV), again got higher priority, and again saw it fall into German hands, almost exactly a year later, in February 1944.

As Coastal Command predicted, the Germans captured the damaged H2S, which would have been next to impossible from a Coastal Command aircraft downed at sea, rather than over land, and Telefunken produced the Rotterdam Gerät (Rotterdam Device, named for where it was captured). Coastal Command's first ASV.III-equipped patrol took place over the Bay of Biscay 1 March. ASV.III made its first U-boat contact on the night of 17 March, but unfortunately the carrier Wellington suffered a malfunction of its Leigh Light and was unable to press home the attack. The first attack using the system occurred the next night. When ASV.III did enter service, German submariners, right up to Dönitz, began to mistakenly believe British aircraft were homing on emissions from the Metox receiver, which no longer gave warning. Meantime, German scientists were perfecting the Rotterdam Gerät to create a submersible version for U-boat defense, of the aviation-utilized FuG 350 Naxos radar detector for night fighters, the submersible version getting the FuMB7 Naxos U designation.  While fragile, Naxos worked. However, it entered service the same day as the 10 GHz-emissions H2X (which Naxos could not detect) became operational in Coastal Command. Naxos was replaced by FuMB36 Tunis in May 1944, and was supplemented by Stumpf, what today would be called radar absorbent material, under the codename Schornsteinfeger ("Chimneysweep").

Just before the TRIDENT Conference, Admiral Ernest J. King got control of A/S aircraft from the Army Air Force, arranging a trade of B-24s for comparable types. This enabled Slessor to make a deal with him to "borrow" one squadron. After attacks on ONS 166, the number of VLRs in Newfoundland finally increased. "Canadians had been pressing hard for Liberators since autumn 1942, against British doubts that the RCAF could employ them effectively, while RCAF, for its part, opposed RAF taking over a job RCAF saw as its own. The commanding officer of 120 Squadron, Squadron Leader Bulloch, confirmed RCAF's ability, and in early March 1943, the number in Newfoundland belatedly increased (though it was not enough to constitute 10 Squadron, RCAF, before 10 May), while 120 Squadron's strength doubled. This still only put all of thirty-eight VLRs over the Mid-Atlantic Gap. The arrival of 25th Antisubmarine Wing, USAAF, with its medium-range B-24s (equipped with H2S, probably built by Canadians), made it possible to free up Coastal Command VLRs without it. The growth in numbers of escort carriers meant "a dramatic increase of USAAF Fortresses and medium-range Liberators" could be based in Newfoundland. 25h Wing flew over the Bay of Biscay, where they sank one U-boat before being redeployed to Morocco.

Increasing availability of escort carriers reduced the hazard of the Gap. After a crisis in March which nearly had Churchill and the Admiralty abandon convoys altogether, the Mid-Atlantic Gap was finally closed in May 1943, when RCAF VLRs became operational in Newfoundland, by which time the Battle of the Atlantic was largely won.

See also
Mid-Ocean Escort Force  
Mid-Ocean Meeting Point
GIUK gap
CAM ship
MAC ship
Project Habakkuk

Notes

References 
 Bowen, E. G.  Radar Days.  Philadelphia:  Institute of Physics Publishers, 1998. (Reprints A. Hilger 1987 edition).
 Costello, John, and Hughes, Terry. The Battle of the Atlantic. London: Collins, 1977. .
 Deighton, Len. Bomber. St Albans: Triad, 1978.
 Gordon, Don E. Electronic warfare: Element of Strategy and Multiplier of Combat Power. New York: Pergamon Press, 1981.
 Harris, Arthur T., Marshal of the Royal Air Force. Bomber Offensive. Toronto:  Stoddart, 1990 (reprints 1947 Collins edition).
 Hartcup, Guy. The Challenge of War: Britain's scientific and engineering contributions to World War Two. New York: Taplinger Publishing Co., 1970.
 Ireland, Bernard. The Battle of the Atlantic. Annapolis, MD:  United States Naval Institute Press, 2003.
 Jones, R. V., Professor. Most Secret War: British Scientific Intelligence 1939–1945. London: Coronet Books, 1979 (reprints 1978 Hamish Hamilton edition).
 Longmate, Norman. The Bombers: The RAF offensive against Germany 1939–1945. London: Hutchinson, 1983. .
 Lyall, Gavin. The War in the Air: The Royal Air Force in World War II. 	New York: Morrow, 1968.
 Middlebrook, Martin. Convoy. New York: William Morrow & Co., 1976.
 Milner, Marc. North Atlantic run: the Royal Canadian Navy and the battle for the convoys. Annapolis, MD:  United States Naval Institute Press, 1985.
 Milner, Marc. Battle of the Atlantic. St. Catherines, ON: Vanwell Publishing, 2003.
 Price, Alfred, Dr. Aircraft versus submarine: the evolution of the anti-submarine aircraft, 1912 to 1972.  London, Kimber, 1973.
 Saward, Dudley. "Bomber" Harris: The Story of Marshal of the Royal Air Force, Sir Arthur Harris, Bt, GCG, OBE, AFC, LLD, Air Officer Commanding-in-Chief, Bomber Command, 1942–1945. Garden City, N.Y. : Doubleday, 1985.
 Terraine, John. The Right of the Line. London: Wordsworth, 1997.  (reprints 1985 edition).
 Van der Vat, Dan. The Atlantic Campaign : World War II's great struggle at sea. New York: Harper & Row, 1988.

Anti-submarine warfare
Battle of the Atlantic